opened as the successor to the Ishibashi Museum of Art in Kurume, Fukuoka Prefecture, Japan in 2016. It forms part of the Ishibashi Culture Center, which opened in 1956, alongside the studio of yōga painter , relocated from Yame in 1980, and Shōjirō Ishibashi Memorial Museum, dedicated to the founder of Bridgestone and donated to the city by the Ishibashi Foundation after renovation in 2016, on the sixtieth anniversary of the Ishibashi Culture Center's opening. The focus of the collection is the work of local artists, notably Kurume scions Aoki Shigeru and Sakamoto Hanjirō, as well as Kyūshū yōga more generally.

See also

 List of Cultural Properties of Japan - paintings (Fukuoka)
 List of Historic Sites of Japan (Fukuoka)
 Kyushu National Museum
 Artizon Museum

References

External links
 Kurume City Art Museum

Kurume
Museums in Fukuoka Prefecture
Art museums and galleries in Japan
Museums established in 2016
2016 establishments in Japan